Philipp Schmiedl (born 23 July 1997) is an Austrian professional footballer who plays as a centre-back for ASV Siegendorf.

Club career
He made his professional Austrian Football Second League debut for Juniors OÖ on 29 July 2018 in a game against Wacker Innsbruck II.

On 23 July 2019 he signed a two-year contract with an additional one-year extension option with SCR Altach. He made his Austrian Football Bundesliga debut with SCR Altach on 15 September 2019 in a game against St. Pölten.

On 3 October 2020, Schmiedl signed a four-year contract with Danish Superliga club SønderjyskE. To get more playing time, Schmiedl returned to Austria on 31 August 2021, signing a season-long loan deal with Admira Wacker. On 27 July 2022, after returning from his latest loan spell, Schmiedl left SønderjyskE to join Hungarian side Mezőkövesdi SE.

On 27 June 2022, Schmiedl joined Hungarian club Mezőkövesd. In January 2023, he moved to the Austrian third-tier Austrian Regionalliga club ASV Siegendorf.

References

External links
 

1997 births
People from Mattersburg District
Footballers from Burgenland
Living people
Austrian footballers
Austria youth international footballers
Association football defenders
SK Rapid Wien players
Union St. Florian players
FC Juniors OÖ players
SC Rheindorf Altach players
SønderjyskE Fodbold players
FC Admira Wacker Mödling players
Mezőkövesdi SE footballers
Austrian Football Bundesliga players
2. Liga (Austria) players
Austrian Regionalliga players
Danish Superliga players
Nemzeti Bajnokság I players
Austrian expatriate footballers
Expatriate men's footballers in Denmark
Austrian expatriate sportspeople in Denmark
Expatriate footballers in Hungary
Austrian expatriate sportspeople in Hungary